X Marks the Spot may refer to:
 X Marks the Spot (1931 film), a 1931 film directed by Erle C. Kenton
 X Marks the Spot (1942 film), a 1942 film directed by George Sherman
 X Marks the Spot, a 1944 social guidance film, spoofed in Season 2 of Mystery Science Theatre 3000
 X Marks the Spot (game show), a BBC Radio 4 game show which aired from 1998 to 2006
 X Marks the Spot (album), an album by Ex Girlfriend
 "X Marks the Spot", a song by Coldplay on their 2015 album A Head Full of Dreams
 "X Marks the Spot", a song by Sonata Arctica on their 2014 album Pariah's Child
 "X Marks the Spot", an episode of the television series Never the Twain
 "Ex Marks the Spot" (Time Squad), a 2003 episode of Time Squad
 "Planet X Marks The Spot", a song by Doctor Steel

See also
 X mark
 X (disambiguation)
 "X Spots the Mark", The Richies episode
 Pirates in popular culture